The  was a limited express sleeping car train service operated by West Japan Railway Company (JR West) in Japan from 1989 until March 2015. From May 2015 until March 2016, the train operated as a luxury cruise train between Osaka and Shimonoseki in western Japan.

Overview
The train then made four more stops before arriving at Sapporo at 09:52.

The same stops were made in the reverse, with the Twilight Express departing Sapporo at 14:05 and making its final pickup at Tōya at 16:33. The first stop at Niitsu was made at 04:33, with the train eventually making its way to Kyoto at 12:15 and finally arriving at Osaka at 12:52.

The Twilight Express consisted of type "A" and "B" accommodations, all specific to this particular train. A flat fee was charged for all berths, regardless of starting or ending location. The other fares, the basic fare and limited express fare, were based on distance. For tourists using the Japan Rail Pass, the basic fare did not have to be paid, although the limited express fare and room fare had to be paid.

Trains departed several times per week, with more departures during holiday periods.

This service operated until March 2016.

Route
The Twilight Express ran on the following lines:

West Japan Railway Company (JR West)
 JR Kyoto Line (Tokaido Main Line), Osaka - Yamashina
 Kosei Line, Yamashina - Omi-Shiotsu
 Hokuriku Main Line, Omi-Shiotsu - Naoetsu

East Japan Railway Company (JR East)
 Shinetsu Main Line, Naoetsu - Niitsu
 Uetsu Main Line, Niitsu - Akita
 Ou Main Line, Akita - Aomori Signal1

Hokkaido Railway Company (JR Hokkaido)
 Tsugaru Kaikyō Line, Aomori Signal - Kanita2 - Goryōkaku1
 Hakodate Main Line, Goryōkaku - Oshamambe
 Muroran Main Line, Oshamambe - Numanohata
 Chitose Line, Numanohata - Shiroishi
 Hakodate Main Line, Shiroishi - Sapporo

1Train reversal point
2Crew change location for conductors (JR West and JR Hokkaido)

The Tsugaru Kaikyō Line runs over the tracks of the Tsugaru Line, Kaikyō Line, Esashi Line, and Hakodate Main Line.

Formations

July 1989 - December 1989
The original charter train formation operating from 21 July 1989 was as follows. The view from inside the "royal suite" in car 8 was obstructed by the adjacent generator van.

December 1989 - July 1990
From 2 December 1989, trains were formed as follows.

July 1990 - March 2015
From 20 July 1990, trains were lengthened to nine cars (plus a generator van), and formed as shown below.

May 2015 - March 2016
From May 2015, the following formation was used for cruise train services. The "OHaNeFu 25" car was not used by passengers on these services.

Rolling stock

Locomotives
Three types of locomotives were used to haul the Twilight Express service:

Osaka to Aomori: JR West Class EF81 AC/DC electric locomotive assigned to Fukui Depot
Aomori to Goryōkaku: JR Hokkaido Class ED79 AC electric locomotive assigned to Hakodate Depot
Goryōkaku to Sapporo: JR Hokkaido Class DD51 diesel locomotives assigned to Hakodate Depot (double-headed)

, five specially-liveried Class EF81 locomotives were assigned for Twilight Express duties, numbers EF81 43, 44, 103, 113, and 114. Locomotive number EF81 104 was also formerly used on Twilight Express services, but was withdrawn in 2013.

Coaches
, three 9-car 24 series trainsets were used on Twilight Express services, formed as follows. The former coach numbers and conversion dates are shown below the current running numbers.

Four generator vans, numbered "KaNi 24 10, 12, 13, and 14", were used with the Twilight Express trainsets.

Timetable 
The train timetable  was as follows. For the Osaka departure to Sapporo, read down. For the Sapporo departure to Osaka, read up. Stations that were not used for passenger pick-up or drop-off are in italics.

History

The Twilight Express first ran on 18 July 1989 from Osaka to Sapporo and back as a special preview run for invited passengers. From 21 July, it began operating as a charter service. A second rake of coaches was introduced from December 1989, allowing operation as a seasonal service. "A"-type sleeping cars were added to the formations between 1990 and 1991, and the formations were extended to 10 cars (including generator car). In April 1991, a third rake of coaches was introduced, allowing daily operations during busy seasons. The coaches underwent a program of interior refurbishment between 2001 and 2002.

Withdrawal
Twilight Express services were discontinued from March 2015, with the final services departing from both Osaka and Sapporo on 12 March, arriving at their destinations the following day.

Special Twilight Express cruise train
This operated until March 2016, with the last service departing from Osaka on 19 March, returning on 22 March.

Future developments
In June 2017, JR West introduced a new luxury sleeping-car excursion train named Twilight Express Mizukaze, continuing the name and brand established by the Twilight Express train service.

Preservation
Former Twilight Express Class EF81 electric locomotive EF81 103 is exhibited at the Kyoto Railway Museum, which opened in April 2016, together with four former Twilight Express 24 series coaches, sleeping car SuRoNeFu 25-501, dining car SuShi 24-1, lounge car OHa 25-551, and generator van KaNi 24-12.

In popular culture
The Twilight Express formed the main backdrop for the TBS TV drama , starring Kōichi Satō and Miho Nakayama, and broadcast on 20 March 2012.

The Twilight Express's dining car was featured in Chapters 41 an 42 of Ekiben Hitoritabi, a manga about ekiben.

See also
 List of named passenger trains of Japan

References

External links

Dream Rail Trip on Twilight Express 2004 promotional video for the Twilight Express.
Twilight Express Train Gallery Twilight Express train route and composition information. 

West Japan Railway Company
Named passenger trains of Japan
Night trains of Japan
1989 establishments in Japan
Railway services introduced in 1989
2016 disestablishments in Japan
Railway services discontinued in 2016